Eetu Antti Oskari Heino (born 5 September 1988) is a Finnish badminton player. He started playing badminton at his school in Pargas, then in 2006, he joined the Finnish national badminton team. In 2014, he won a bronze medal at the European Men's Team Championships in Basel, Switzerland.

Achievements

BWF International Challenge/Series 
Men's singles

  BWF International Challenge tournament
  BWF International Series tournament

References

External links 
 

1988 births
Living people
People from Kaarina
Finnish male badminton players
Badminton players at the 2015 European Games
Badminton players at the 2019 European Games
European Games competitors for Finland
Sportspeople from Southwest Finland
21st-century Finnish people